Pizzo Pianca is a mountain of the Swiss Lepontine Alps, located north of Olivone in the canton of Ticino. On its southern side it overlooks the lake of Luzzone.

References

External links
 Pizzo Pianca on Hikr

Mountains of the Alps
Mountains of Ticino
Lepontine Alps
Mountains of Switzerland